Roberto Orlando Affonso Júnior (born 28 May 1983 in São Paulo, Brazil), commonly known as Roberto Júnior, is a professional footballer who currently plays for Hong Kong Premier League club Kitchee as a defensive midfielder. Born in Brazil, he represented the Hong Kong national team.

Club career
Roberto Júnior started his senior career in Brazil with Santos.

On 18 June 2017, Eastern's chairman Peter Leung claimed that Roberto was offered a two-year contract by R&F. Two weeks later, the two clubs agreed on a HKD$250,000 transfer fee. On 14 October 2020, Roberto left the club after his club's withdrawal from the HKPL in the new season.

On 17 February 2021, Kitchee announced the signing of Roberto.

International career
Roberto Júnior was born and raised in Brazil, but became a naturalized citizen of Hong Kong after 9 years of residence. He got a callup to the Hong Kong national football team, and made his debut in a World Cup qualifier 2-0 loss against Qatar.

Career statistics

Club 
As of 22 May 2021

International

International goals
Scores and results list Hong Kong's goal tally first.

Honours

Club
Sun Hei
 Hong Kong Senior Shield: 2011–12, 2012–13

Eastern
 Hong Kong Premier League: 2015–16
 Hong Kong Senior Shield: 2014–15, 2015–16

References

External links

1983 births
Living people
Footballers from São Paulo
Hong Kong footballers
Hong Kong international footballers
Brazilian footballers
Brazilian emigrants to Hong Kong
Association football midfielders
Santos FC players
Sun Hei SC players
Eastern Sports Club footballers
R&F (Hong Kong) players
Kitchee SC players
Hong Kong First Division League players
Hong Kong Premier League players
Expatriate footballers in Hong Kong
Brazilian expatriate sportspeople in Hong Kong
Naturalized footballers of Hong Kong
Hong Kong League XI representative players